Dashirabdan Odboevich Batozhabai was a Soviet writer of Buryat origin. He was born in 1921 in Dogoi in the Aginsky Buryat District of the Trans-Baikal Territory.

After graduating from the Zugalai school at the age of 15, he entered the Ulan-Ude Theater and Music College (1936-1939). The onset of the Great Patriotic War prompted him to study at the Novosibirsk short-term military flight school (1941) and he served as a pilot of a heavy long-range bomber. After the war, he entered the Gorky Literary Institute (1952-1957). He worked as an actor of the Buryat Drama Theater, in the editorial office of the Buryad-Mongoloy Onen newspaper, as editor in the literary editorial office of the Republican Radio Committee, as head of the literary section of the Buryat State Academic Drama Theater, etc.

A talented writer, poet and playwright, Batozhabai made a significant contribution to the development of Buryat literature and art. In 1945, while still in the army, he published his first pieces in the pages of the Buryad-Mongoloy Onen newspaper, including the poem “The Young Hero Senge and His Friend Sunda Mergen”. After demobilization, he wrote one-act plays for amateur drama groups - "Malshad" (Cattlemen) (1948), "Dagbyn alduu" (Dagba's mistake) (1949), "Shүүberi" (Winning) (1952), etc., which dealt with contemporary themes. During his studies at the Gorky Literary Institute, he wrote a story in his native language "The Most Dear", published the story "Bagshashni heng be?" (Who is your teacher?) And "Aduushanai duun" (Song of the herdman), and wrote multi-act plays "The River of Fire", "Manai kolkhoz deere" (In our collective farm), "Doibod sokhilgo" (Horse ride), "Shuurg haruulna's barometer" ( The barometer shows the storm), etc. He also finished the first book of the trilogy "Tөөrigdeһen khubi zayan" (Stolen happiness).

The story "Aduushanai duun" (Song of the Herder) was published in 1955 and became widely known after the release of the feature film The Song of the Herder (1957) based on this story. His prominence continued in Buryat letters and arts: a performance based on his play “The Barometer Shows the Storm” was staged, while the premiere of the film Golden House, released by Mosfilm based on a script by Batobazhai, G. Tsydynzhapov, V. Yezhova, also took place.

As a playwright, Batozhabai created many plays. The most significant of them are "The Tale of the Mother" (1967), "The Years of Fire" (1969), "Urban Marries" (1970), "Thunderstorm", etc. Batozhabai worked successfully not only as the creator of original dramatic works, but also as the head of the literary department of the Buryat Drama Theater, which actively contributed to the formation of his repertoire. He translated into the Buryat language the works of Russian writers such as Shukshin, A. Vampilov, B. Vasiliev, A. Balburov, etc. for the Buryat theatre.

The pinnacle of his work is considered to be the novel-trilogy "Stolen Happiness" (1966), which reflects a crucial period in the life of the Buryat people at the turn of the 19th and 20th centuries. The trilogy is a fusion of Buryat folklore with the traditions of the Russian and European novel. In the last years of his life, Batozhabai worked on the historical and revolutionary novel "Uulyn burged" (Mountain Eagles) (1976), where the author depicts one of the dramatic periods of the Russian civil war in Siberia. Over the years, collections of stories and novellas appeared, among them "Hashalshni khaanab?" (Where is your conscience?) (1962), "Shalhuu Rabdanai khurun" (Stories of the Restless Rabdan) (1991), "Marhain khurun" (Markhai's Tales) (2001) and others.

His work has been translated extensively in Russian. One of his stories was also included in an anthology of stories from the Soviet East; this book appeared in Bengali and Arabic language editions, under the aegis of the Foreign Language Literature Publishers in Moscow.

He died in Moscow in 1977.

References

Soviet writers
Buryat writers
Maxim Gorky Literature Institute alumni
1921 births
1977 deaths